Nanning is the capital of Guangxi Zhuang Autonomous Region, China.

Nanning can also refer to:
 Nanning Railway Station
 Nanning Wuxu International Airport
 Barbara Nanning (born 1957), Dutch artist
 Nanningosaurus. a dinosaur genus